The Journal of Business Venturing is a bimonthly peer-reviewed multidisciplinary academic journal publishing research on all aspects of entrepreneurship. Its scope spans the disciplines of economics, psychology, and sociology. It was established in 1985 by Ian MacMillan and is published by Elsevier. The editor-in-chief is Jeff McMullen (Indiana University). According to the Journal Citation Reports, the journal has a 2019 impact factor of 13.14 It is one of the 50 journals that the Financial Times uses to compile its business school rankings.

The journal summary website (externally facing) is www.JournalOfBusinessVenturing.com

Since 2014, the journal awards the "Journal of Business Venturing Best Paper Award".

References

External links

Publications established in 1985
Entrepreneurship
Business and management journals
Multidisciplinary social science journals
Elsevier academic journals
Bimonthly journals
English-language journals